Lemniscia is a genus of air-breathing land snails, terrestrial pulmonate gastropod mollusks in the family Geomitridae, the hairy snails and their allies.

Species
Species within the genus Lemniscia include:
 Lemniscia galeata (R. T. Lowe, 1862)
 Lemniscia michaudi (Deshayes, 1832)
Synonyms
 Lemniscia calva (R. T. Lowe, 1831): synonym of Caseolus (Caseolus) calvus (R. T. Lowe, 1831) represented as Caseolus calvus (R. T. Lowe, 1831)

References

 Bank, R. A. (2017). Classification of the Recent terrestrial Gastropoda of the World. Last update: July 16th, 2017

External links
 Nomenclator Zoologicus info
  Lowe, R. T. (1855 ("1854")). Catalogus molluscorum pneumonatorum insularum Maderensium: or a list of all the land and freshwater shells, recent and fossil, of the Madeiran islands: arranged in groups according to their natural affinities; with diagnoses of the groups, and of the new or hitherto imperfectly defined species. Proceedings of the Zoological Society of London. 22: 161-208

 
Geomitridae
Taxonomy articles created by Polbot